The Cat B25 is a mobile phone introduced in 2013 created by Bullitt Group with the license from Caterpillar Inc. as the first phone in the Cat phones line. The objective of the phone is to be a rugged and resilient option to be used with minimal damage.

It is a slight redesign of the JCB Sitemaster 2, another phone by Bullitt released in 2012 for their former licensee JCB, changing the color from yellow to grey, and modifying the rubber grip around the phone to the appearance to a continuous track.

External links

References

Cat phone
Mobile phones introduced in 2013